Stephen "Mac" McMahon (21 December 1954 – 9 October 2021), FMedSci, was the Sherrington Professor of Physiology at King's College London, and Director of the Wellcome Trust / London Pain Consortium. Professor McMahon led a world-renowned research laboratory at the Wolfson Centre for Age-Related Diseases in central London from 1985-2021.

An outstanding educator as well as researcher, Professor McMahon was the editor of Wall and Melzack’s Textbook of Pain, 5th and 6th Edition (7th Edition in preparation). He published more than 300 research articles in scientific journals including Nature, Nature Medicine, Science Translational Medicine, Nature Neuroscience, Cell, Neuron and the Journal of Neuroscience, with an H-index of 91.

Education 
Professor McMahon was educated at the University of Leeds where he was awarded a BSc (Hons) and PhD in Physiology. His PhD was supervised by John F B Morrison and completed in 1979 with a thesis entitled 'An electrophysiological study of spinal neurons activated by stimulation of the abdominal viscera'.

Career and research 
Professor McMahon's research trajectory was strongly influenced by Patrick Wall with whom he trained at University College London and St Thomas' Hospital in the 1980s. Like Patrick Wall, Professor McMahon is remembered as a world-leading pain research expert.

Commanding a large range of techniques ranging from molecular biology, in vivo and ex vivo electrophysiology and behavioural studies in animal models, in vivo imaging, cell sorting and RNAseq, to genome profiling in patients and human psychophysics, the McMahon laboratory contributed greatly to understanding of basic pain physiology on both a systemic (pain pathways) and molecular (pain mediators and receptors) level. Additionally, a large body of Professor McMahon's research worked to translate basic pain mechanisms towards the clinic - contributing to research on GDNF, NGF and P2X3 receptors resulting in several phase I, II and III clinical trials for pain treatment.

As well as pain research, Professor McMahon was a key contributor to the field of neuroregeneration, both following spinal cord injury and in the context of peripheral nerve damage.

McMahon was an expert, champion and mentor: many prominent researchers trained with him, becoming Professors themselves, including Gary Lewin, Andrew Rice, Elizabeth Bradbury, and David Bennett.

Awards and honours 
Professor McMahon received a number of awards for his research, including the Outstanding Contribution to Neuroscience Award from the British Neuroscience Association (2019), the Patrick Wall Lecture from the Australian Pain Society (2018), the John J. Bonica Distinguished Lecture Award from the International Association for the Study of Pain (2016), and the GL Brown Lecturer Award from the Physiological Society (2001).

He was elected a Fellow of the Academy of Medical Sciences (FMedSci) in 1999.

Wellcome Trust Pain Consortium and collective efforts 
Amongst many individual prizes and grants, Professor McMahon was strongly involved with large collaborative efforts to understand pain pathophysiology. Professor McMahon directed the Wellcome Trust Pain Consortium (previously known as the London Pain Consortium). He was an academic lead on Europain, an EU-IMI consortium and deputy Chair of the MRC Neuroscience and Mental Health Board. He was a Principal Investigator for the BonePain: European Training Network to Combat Bone Pain. In addition, Professor McMahon was an enthusiastic communicator of science within academia but also widely to the public.

References 

1954 births
2021 deaths
Scientists from London
British neuroscientists
Alumni of the University of Leeds
Academics of King's College London